Anouar Hadouir (born 14 September 1982) is a Dutch former footballer who plays for SV CHC Den Bosch.

Career
Hadouir was born in 's-Hertogenbosch and made his debut in professional football, being part of the Willem II squad in the 2002–03 season. In 2007, Hadouir signed with Roda JC where he stayed four seasons. In July 2011, Alemannia Aachen of the German 2. Bundesliga signed Hadouir on a two-year contract. On 6 July 2012, he joined NAC Breda on a free transfer.

In 2014, he moved to Morocco to play for Moghreb Tétouan. He returned to the Eredivisie in July 2016, signing with Excelsior.

Ahead of the 2019/20 season, Hadouir joined SV CHC Den Bosch where his two brothers, Younes and Mounir, also was playing.

Personal life
Born in the Netherlands, Hadouir is of Moroccan descent.

Career statistics

References

External links
 

1982 births
Living people
Sportspeople from 's-Hertogenbosch
Footballers from North Brabant
Dutch footballers
Dutch sportspeople of Moroccan descent
Association football midfielders
Eredivisie players
2. Bundesliga players
Willem II (football club) players
Roda JC Kerkrade players
Alemannia Aachen players
NAC Breda players
Moghreb Tétouan players
Excelsior Rotterdam players